The British Rail Class 777 METRO is a class of electric multiple unit passenger trains currently under construction by Swiss rolling stock manufacturer Stadler Rail, being used on the Merseyrail network in the Liverpool City Region and adjacent areas of Cheshire and Lancashire. Ordered in 2016, construction of the units began in 2018. The first unit entered service on 23 January 2023, following delays to the deployment programme. The Class 777 will replace Merseyrail's current  and  units, which were built between 1978 and 1980. Seven units of the total 53 ordered are being configured as battery electric multiple units (BEMUs) for use on non-electrified lines, and will be designated subclass 777/1.

History

Background 
While the Class 507 and 508 are not the oldest electric multiple-units in use in Great Britain (which are the 1976-vintage Class 313 on the National Rail network, and the even older 1972 stock and 1973 stock on London Underground), Merseytravel has the oldest average fleet.

In 2014, Liverpool City Region set out a 30 year rail vision, outlining investments that would and could be made to improve rail transport in the region. This included replacement of both the Class 507 and 508 trains with a new high capacity, dual voltage train fleet. In 2015, Merseytravel gained approval to go out to tender to replace the train fleet. In January 2016, Merseytravel announced that a total of five rolling-stock manufacturers had been shortlisted to build the new fleet – Bombardier, Siemens, CAF, Stadler Rail, and a consortium of Mitsui, Alstom, and the East Japan Railway Company.

Contract award 
On 16 December 2016, Merseytravel announced Stadler Rail would manufacture a new fleet of 52 dual-voltage-capable articulated four-car units as part of a £460million fleet replacement project. Merseytravel has an option for a further 60 units. Delivery of the Class 777 fleet was scheduled to start in mid-2019, and its entry into service was set for the following year. The new trains would increase capacity by 60%, as well as cutting journey times due to faster acceleration.

The purchase was financed by Liverpool City Region itself, rather than an external agency such as a bank or rolling stock leasing company. The Class 777 units will therefore be owned by the regional public transport operator Merseytravel and leased to the franchise operator Merseyrail; this made Merseytravel the only public-sector mainline rolling-stock owner in the United Kingdom. This is unlike the preceding fleet, owned by the private leasing agent Angel Trains.

Merseytravel elected to have the new fleet's maintenance requirements addressed via a contract with Stadler; this arrangement included the modernisation of two existing traction maintenance depots (TMD), at Kirkdale and Birkenhead North. For training purposes, a driver cab simulator has been installed in Kirkdale TMD.

As part of Merseytravel's plan to extend the Kirkby line to the new Headbolt Lane railway station using battery-powered Class 777 units, the Class 777 order was increased from 52 to 53 units so that there would be sufficient stock for battery testing to take place.

Infrastructure modifications 
To accommodate the new Class 777 fleet, extensive infrastructure changes were necessitated. These adaptations were performed under a rolling programme between October 2018 and May 2019; changes included adjustments to 97 platforms at 56 stations across the Merseyrail network, along with track realignments and other refinements, primarily for the purpose of improving passenger accessibility. Another cause for the alterations was the increased length of the new units, which was addressed via a mixture of platform lengthening and signal repositioning where required. The programme was structured as to minimise disruption to Merseyrail's scheduled services wherever possible. A new trackside Wi-Fi network, provided by Panasonic, was installed to provide continuous real-time connectivity between all trains and the Sandhills control centre, along with free internet access for passengers. New bulk power supplies were installed, along with eight new substations and miscellaneous cable upgrades, to provide greater quantities of electricity.

Unlike the preceding trains, the Class 777 was designed to be operated without guards; however, the announced proposal to redeploy guards into other customer service roles within Merseyrail was subject to considerable criticism. Accordingly, while the fleet was initially to be launched under driver-only operations, in September 2018 it was announced that there would be a second member of staff on board, ending a two-year dispute between the National Union of Rail, Maritime and Transport Workers (RMT) and Merseyrail.

Testing and delivery 

During early October 2018 the bodyshells for the first unit were completed. This unit subsequently underwent pre-delivery dynamic testing in both Switzerland and Germany during late 2019. The first unit, 777003, was delivered to Kirkdale TMD on 16 January 2020. On 16 March 2020, the unit commenced test runs on the Kirkby branch of the Northern Line. By October 2020, ten units had been delivered to Kirkdale TMD. 

In 2018, it was announced that a train configured as a battery electric multiple unit was to be tested on sections of unelectrified track.
Following the trial, it was announced in July 2021 that the units tested had been able to travel up to 20 miles without the need for recharging. The Liverpool City Region Combined Authority announced that the battery-powered trains will run to the new Headbolt Lane station at Kirkby, which is due to open in 2023.

In July 2021, full daytime testing of the units was underway. In August 2021, the Office of Rail and Road (ORR) authorised the introduction of these units into passenger operation. In May 2022, it was expected that the fleet would be "phased into service by autumn" of the same year, with no exact date given.

Passenger services with the class commenced on 23 January 2023, initially using unit 777049. The fleet will first be deployed on the Kirkby branch of the Northern Line, followed by the Ormskirk branch. Deployment on the other sections of the Northern Line, and on the Wirral Line, will follow later in 2023.

Design
As part of the Stadler Metro train family, the units are built on the same platform as the BVG Class IK stock used on the Berlin U-Bahn and future units being developed for the Minsk Metro and Glasgow Subway. The units are configured for high-capacity, delivering a 50% increase in per-carriage capacity than the preceding fleets. It has a higher rate of acceleration, yet uses 20% less energy than the old rolling stock, due to increased system efficiency and a reduced weight, being roughly 5.5tonnes lighter. The introduction of the Class 777 is reportedly set to achieve a 10% reduction in journey time over older stock, attributed to its greater rate of acceleration. There is also an emphasis on shared data; each train will actively monitor the number of passengers on board and relay this to Merseyrail's Sandhills control centre, allowing for more informed and responsive management of the network.

Each Class 777 unit has two longer driving trailer vehicles positioned at each end, with one set of twin doors on either side, whilst the two intermediate motor cars have two sets of doors. For accessibility purposes, all doorways have been outfitted with sliding steps that move into position when the train is stopped at a platform, enabling passengers using wheelchairs to board and disembark without relying upon a separately deployed ramp. The carriages will feature an open gangway design, the first class of train on the Merseyrail network to feature this design. The passenger facilities are much improved over legacy stock, each carriage being fitted with modern amenities such as electrical and USB sockets, as well as bike racks. Like the previous Class 507 and 508 fleets, the Class 777s will not be fitted with toilets. As part of the bespoke design, an LED letter 'M' has been sandwiched between the headlight clusters, illuminating yellow on the front of the train, and red on the rear.

Because current regulatory policy makes it unlikely that future extensions of Merseyrail's unshielded third rail traction power supply will be approved, Class 777 units will be delivered with provision for the future installation of  overhead line traction equipment. There is also allowance for the new trains to be configured as battery electric multiple units (BEMUs), which would allow them to operate on unelectrified lines without needing infrastructure upgrades. This is in addition to the backup battery set that will be fitted to all Class 777 units from new, as these will only have capacity for short-distance low-speed movements around depots and maintenance facilities.

After successful trials of battery operation in 2021, the Class 777 order was amended so that seven units out of the total 53 would be delivered with the additional traction battery equipment. These units, which Stadler refer to as "independently powered" EMUs, will be numbered in subclass 777/1. The battery packs will be carried on the underframes of the DTSO (driving trailer) vehicles, while the battery cooling systems will be placed on the roofs of the same vehicles. Charging can be performed from the third-rail supply, as well as from regenerative braking. Stadler claim that the battery packs will have a lifespan of at least eight years or 10,000 charge/discharge cycles.

Fleet details

Notes

References

External links 

 New Class 777 train microsite by Merseytravel

777
Stadler Rail multiple units
750 V DC multiple units
Train-related introductions in 2023